Scandal for Sale is a 1932 American pre-Code drama film directed by Russell Mack and starring Charles Bickford, Rose Hobart and Pat O'Brien. The film's sets were designed by the art director Charles D. Hall.

Cast
 Charles Bickford as Jerry Strong  
 Rose Hobart as Claire Strong  
 Pat O'Brien as Waddell  
 Berton Churchill as Bunnyweather 
 J. Farrell MacDonald as Treadway  
 Buster Phelps as Bobby Strong  
 Betty Jane Graham as Mildred Strong  
 Tully Marshall as Simpkins  
 Claudia Dell as Dorothy Pepper  
 Harry Beresford as Brownie  
 Hans von Twardowski as Affner
 Mitchell Harris as Carrington

References

Bibliography
 Colin Schindler. Hollywood in Crisis: Cinema and American Society 1929-1939. Routledge, 2005.

External links
 
 

1932 films
1932 drama films
American black-and-white films
American drama films
Films about journalists
Films directed by Russell Mack
Universal Pictures films
1930s English-language films
1930s American films